Knomos is a workflow and knowledge management application primarily for law firms to handle their cases, with a focus on the legal systems of Europe.

It is an open source (GNU GPL), web-based application.

External links 

 Knomos Source Forge Page 
 Knomos Original Developer 
 Knomos German Home Page 
 Knomos Italian Contributor 
 Knomos-Plus on Google Code 
Free groupware